The Shia Personal Status Law, also known as the Shia Family Law, is a law of Afghanistan that was approved in February 2009 with Afghan President Hamid Karzai's signature. A portion of the law pertaining to sexual relations between husband and wife made international headlines. The United Nations Development Fund for Women, NATO, Canada, United States, Germany and other nations came forward asking for a review of the law, as it was felt that it oppresses Shiite women, taking away many of their rights in a marital relationship. Most controversially, Article 132 specifies that Shia women are required to sexually submit to their husband's demands and are expected to have intercourse with their husband at least once every four days except in case of illness, in what has been described as spousal rape.

The law only affects the Shia denomination of Afghanistan, approximately six million people. Family issues had previously been decided by customary law, so it is considered an improvement on past affairs. Some Afghan politicians feel that it protects women who are weaker than men. Shia officials claim that the new law preserves the distinctions which are inherent between the Shia and Sunni Muslim religions of Afghanistan.

Politics
The original draft, sponsored by the high ranking Shia cleric Asif Mohseni, was sent to parliament in 2006 where it stayed for almost 3 years. After some modifications, the bill was approved by the lower house of the Afghan parliament on 7 February 2009, and then in the upper house later the same month.

In response to international criticism, Hamid Karzai said that "We understand the concerns of our allies in the international community….If there is anything that is of concern to us then we will definitely take action in consultation with our [religious clerics] and send it back to the parliament."

Senator Humeira Namati affirmed that the legislation was not debated, nor read out in the Upper House (parliament). It was just sent to the Supreme Court.

The presidential election was in August, and Afghanistan's Supreme Court gave their approval that Karzai can remain in power. It was after this sanction that the Shia Family Law materialized.

"It's about votes. Karzai is in a hurry to appease the Shia because the elections are on the way." said Shinkai Karokhail, a woman MP, "There are moderate views among the Shia, but unfortunately our MPs, the people who draft the laws, rely on extremists" 

“Due to the sensitivity of this law and the pressure by some Shia lawmakers, it was approved by the parliament as a package, not article by article, which is the procedure for all other bills,” said Sabrina Saqib, a female MP.

Critics of the bill feel that it was passed to appease Shia clerics and Islamic fundamentalists.

Human rights groups and the United Nations High Commissioner for Human Rights report that the parts which have been seen inherently sanction rape within the marriage.

Internationally, there was opposition to the legislation which was reminiscent of the Taliban regime. The Taliban was the ruling authority in Afghanistan between 1996 and 2001. During that time Taliban law forbade women to work and attend school, women had to be completely concealed by a burqa and they could not be in public places without a male family member. "This law is not something that Karzai should sign because there must be mutual agreement within a marriage, but what westerners have to realize is that it is much better for us than it was before when the Taliban behaved so badly towards us," said Shapera Azzizulah, "Under the Taliban I was forced to wear a burka and my sister was beaten once on her feet for only showing her eyes. Now I don't wear a burka, so that is progress."

International reaction
“The government of Afghanistan must abide by international agreements that it has entered into willingly,” said John Hutton, British Defence Secretary.

"We're deeply troubled by it, and I don't think we're by any means alone. Making progress on human rights for women is a significant component of the international engagement in Afghanistan. It's a significant change we want to see from the bad old days of the Taliban," said Stephen Harper, Prime Minister of Canada, "I think President Karzai and those other actors who may be supporting this policy will find themselves under considerable pressure."

"I think this law is abhorrent." said Barack Obama, President of the United States, "Certainly the views of the administration have been, and will be, communicated to the Karzai government. And we think that it is very important for us to be sensitive to local culture, but we also think that there are certain basic principles that all nations should uphold, and respect for women and respect for their freedom and integrity is an important principle."

"The law is another clear indication that the human rights situation in Afghanistan is getting worse not better. Respect for women's rights – and human rights in general – is of paramount importance to Afghanistan's future security and development. This law is a huge step in the wrong direction," said Navi Pillay, United Nations High Commissioner for Human Rights.

"We urge President Karzai to review the law's legal status to correct provisions of the law that ... limit or restrict women's rights," said United States spokesman.
"[The law] legalizes the rape of a wife by her husband.... The law violates women's rights and human rights in numerous ways." was submitted by the United Nations Development Fund for Women (UNIFEM).

International conference regarding Afghanistan
An international conference was held in The Hague regarding Afghanistan at the end of March 2009.
The conference, named A Comprehensive Strategy in a Regional Context, started on 31 March 2009.

"I am sure the conference will give a clear political signal that will make it possible to build a free and prospering Afghanistan," said Jan Peter Balkenende, Prime Minister of the Netherlands.

Protest
A protest hit the streets in Kabul, the capital city of Afghanistan, in April 2009. About 200 women protestors made it to the protest after many were held back by husbands, and not allowed access to public transit. Between 800 and 1,000 counterdemonstrators swamped the women's protest, who were supporters Asif Mohseni. The protesters included Afghan member of Parliament Sabrina Saqeb. When the protest reached the parliamentary grounds a signed petition was presented.

Amendment
On April 7, 2009, Karzai vowed to change the law if it was found to go against the constitution or Islamic law. The law has been placed before the Justice Minister and the top religious leaders. “We have already initiated procedures to correct, if there is anything of concern, that (it) should be changed,” said Karzai “If there is any article in the law that is not in keeping with the Afghan constitution...it should be corrected in consultation with our clergy, in accordance to the constitution and our Islamic Shariah.” “We understand the concerns of our allies in the international community. Those concerns may be out of an inappropriate or not so good translation of the law or a misinterpretation of this,” Karzai also said, "If there is anything that is of concern to us then we will definitely take action in consultation with our ulema (senior clerics) and send it back to the parliament ... This is something we are serious about.”

The third article of the constitution states that no law will transgress against the Islamic religion followed in Afghanistan. The constitution provides a mandate in article seven that the Islamic Republic shall adhere to the Universal Declaration of Human Rights (UDHR) and to other international treaties and conventions which is signatory to. Under Article 22 of the constitution of Afghanistan equality between the sexes is recognised.

"It is a complicated process, and it will take a long time to review every line of the 250 articles of the law. We will consider concerns from everyone and make sure the law meets the human rights standards," said Mohammad Qasim Hashimzai, Deputy Justice Minister.

Shia clergy defended the new law, and felt that the international community has misinterpreted the legislation.

A copy of the bill since it was originally drafted was changed. The age of marriage for women has been changed from nine years old to sixteen. The age at which a mother can keep custody of her daughter after a divorce was raised from seven to nine years old. Politicians in the lower house of Parliament was able to remove the law's stipulation for temporary marriages. Another amendment from the first draft was that a woman could leave the house without a male relative escort if she were to go to work, school or for medical treatment. Canadian International Development Agency CIDA provided funds to the Rights and Democracy organisation which advises Afghanistan on developing new family laws. Some aspects of the law that the staff thought would be repealed were the marriage of girls as young as nine years old to men and that wives did not need the man's permission to work.

See also
 War in Afghanistan (2001–present)
 Sunni-Shia relations relating to Afghanistan
 Religion in Afghanistan
 Human rights in Afghanistan
 Qadria Yazdanparast, Afghan Human Rights Activist

References

External links
Afghanistan: Law of 2009 – Shiite Personal Status Law, unofficial English translation by USAID
Afghanistan's Shiites: Confident Reformers

Shia Islam in Afghanistan
Society of Afghanistan
Politics of Afghanistan
Marriage, unions and partnerships in Afghanistan
Law of Afghanistan
Women's rights in Afghanistan
Human rights in Afghanistan